Meiacanthus phaeus is a species of combtooth blenny found in coral reefs in the western Pacific ocean.

References

phaeus
Fish described in 1976